Masterpieces is the second compilation album by Swedish power metal band HammerFall. It consists of cover versions recorded by the band.

The album cover makes references to the bands being covered by HammerFall, including a Twisted Sister logo spray painted on the wall, a shield with the Warlord logo on it, a stone with the Pretty Maids logo, a pumpkin (Helloween), a Japanese Rising Sun Flag (Loudness), an arm holding a guitar buried on the ground (Rising Force) an 'E' logo of Europe, a razor with Swedish steel written on it (Judas Priest) and a sign indicating Detroit referencing Kiss's Detroit Rock City.  The Park Av. sign is in reference to Skid Row's "Youth Gone Wild," which contains the lyrics "I tell ya Park Avenue leads to Skid Row."  The green-haired zombie is from the cover of Picture's album "Eternal Dark", and the Swedish flag refers to Roger Pontare's representation of Sweden in the 2000 Eurovision Song Contest.

Tracking list

Personnel

HammerFall
 Joacim Cans – vocals (all tracks except track 10)
 Oscar Dronjak – guitar & backing vocals (all tracks), vocals (track 10)
 Glenn Ljungström – guitar (track 1)
 Stefan Elmgren – guitar & backing vocals (tracks 2–15)
 Pontus Norgren – guitar & backing vocals (tracks 16–18)
 Fredrik Larsson – bass & backing vocals (tracks 1, 15–18)
 Magnus Rosén – bass (tracks 2–14)
 Patrik Räfling – drums (tracks 1–5)
 Anders Johansson – drums (tracks 7–18)

"Breaking the Law": all of the band members switched instruments for this version; it features Dronjak as the vocalist, Cans and Rosén on guitars, Räfling on bass, and Elmgren on drums

Guest musicians
 "I Want Out": vocals, guitar and keyboards by Kai Hansen, backing vocals by Udo Dirkschneider
 "Man on the Silver Mountain": drums by AC, backing vocals by Kai Hansen
 "Head Over Heels": lead vocals by Udo Dirkschneider, backing vocals by Kai Hansen

Chart positions

References

External links
Official HammerFall website
Lyrics at Songlyrics

2008 compilation albums
HammerFall albums
Covers albums
Nuclear Blast compilation albums
Albums produced by Jens Bogren